Zarema Sadulayeva (1974 – 10 August 2009) was a Russian children's activist and head of the aid organization Let's Save the Generation, based in Chechnya. She and her husband, Alik Djabrailov (11 August 1976 – 10 August 2009), were found murdered in August 2009.

Biography
She was head of the Let's Save the Generation charity of Chechnya. Her charity works with Unicef to aid Chechen children affected by the violence which has swept the Caucasus region since the 1990s. The charity provides psychological counseling and physical aid to orphans, disabled children and others affected by the wars against Chechen separatists.

Sadulayeva and Djabrailov, who was also active in the charity, married in 2009. Neither were described as politically active.

Kidnapping, death, and aftermath

Sadulayeva and Djabrailov were kidnapped at the aid organization's office by gunmen wearing camouflage uniforms on 9 August 2009. They were both found shot to death in the trunk of Djabrailov's car on 10 August 2009, in Chernorechye, a suburb of Grozny.

Zarema Sadulayeva's death follows the similar kidnapping and murder of human rights activist Natalia Estemirova in Chechnya in July 2009.

See also
List of kidnappings
List of solved missing person cases

References

1974 births
2009 deaths
Chechen activists
Chechen people
Deaths by firearm in Russia
Formerly missing people
Kidnapped Russian people
People from Grozny
People murdered in Russia
Russian activists
Russian murder victims
Russian people of Chechen descent
Russian women activists
Women in the Chechen wars